Ivan Nikčević (born 11 February 1981) is a Serbian handball player for Spanish club Benidorm.

Club career
Over the course of his career that spanned more than two decades, Nikčević played for Crvena zvezda (1998–2005), Altea (2005–2007), Almería (2007–2008), Portland San Antonio (2008–2010), Granollers (2010–2011), Valladolid (2011–2012), Wisła Płock (2012–2016) and Sporting CP (2016–2020). He helped the Portuguese club win the EHF Challenge Cup in the 2016–17 season.

International career
A Serbia international since its inception, Nikčević made his major debut for the national team at the 2009 World Men's Handball Championship. He was also a member of the team that won the silver medal at the 2012 European Men's Handball Championship. After serving as team captain at the 2016 European Men's Handball Championship, Nikčević retired from the national team.

Honours
Crvena zvezda
 Serbia and Montenegro Handball Super League: 2003–04
 Serbia and Montenegro Handball Cup: 2003–04
Sporting CP
 Andebol 1: 2016–17, 2017–18
 EHF Challenge Cup: 2016–17

References

External links

 EHF record
 Olympic record

1981 births
Living people
Sportspeople from Nikšić
Serbs of Montenegro
Serbian male handball players
Olympic handball players of Serbia
Handball players at the 2012 Summer Olympics
RK Crvena zvezda players
SDC San Antonio players
BM Granollers players
BM Valladolid players
Liga ASOBAL players
Expatriate handball players
Serbian expatriate sportspeople in Spain
Serbian expatriate sportspeople in Poland
Serbian expatriate sportspeople in Portugal